Frank Register is an American engineer, currently the Herring Professor at University of Texas at Austin.

References

Year of birth missing (living people)
Living people
University of Texas at Austin faculty
21st-century American engineers
North Carolina State University alumni